Loaningfoot is a hamlet in the parish of Kirkbean in Dumfries and Galloway, Scotland. It is 10 miles ESE of the town of Dalbeattie.

References

Villages in Dumfries and Galloway